The Adamant Range is a subrange of the Big Bend Ranges of the Selkirk Mountains of the Columbia Mountains in southeastern British Columbia, Canada, located on the west side of Columbia Reach, Kinbasket Lake, north of Glacier National Park.

References

Adamant Range in the Canadian Mountain Encyclopedia

Big Bend Ranges